Großbach is a river of Rhineland-Palatinate, Germany.

The Großbach is built by the confluence of the Leizenbach and Siener Bach at Otzweiler. It is a right tributary of the Nahe at Kirn.

See also
List of rivers of Rhineland-Palatinate

References

Rivers of Rhineland-Palatinate
Rivers of Germany